Lafayette Township may refer to:

Arkansas
 Lafayette Township, Lonoke County, Arkansas, in Lonoke County, Arkansas
 Lafayette Township, Ouachita County, Arkansas, in Ouachita County, Arkansas
 Lafayette Township, Scott County, Arkansas, in Scott County, Arkansas

Illinois
 Lafayette Township, Coles County, Illinois
 LaFayette Township, Ogle County, Illinois

Indiana
 Lafayette Township, Allen County, Indiana
 Lafayette Township, Floyd County, Indiana
 Lafayette Township, Madison County, Indiana
 Lafayette Township, Owen County, Indiana

Iowa
 Lafayette Township, Allamakee County, Iowa
 Lafayette Township, Bremer County, Iowa
 Lafayette Township, Keokuk County, Iowa
 Lafayette Township, Story County, Iowa

Kansas
 Lafayette Township, Chautauqua County, Kansas

Michigan
 Lafayette Township, Michigan

Minnesota
 Lafayette Township, Minnesota

Missouri
 Lafayette Township, Clinton County, Missouri
 Lafayette Township, St. Louis County, Missouri, in St. Louis County, Missouri

New Jersey
 Lafayette Township, New Jersey

Ohio
 Lafayette Township, Coshocton County, Ohio
 Lafayette Township, Medina County, Ohio

Pennsylvania
 Lafayette Township, Pennsylvania

See also
 Fayette Township (disambiguation)

Township name disambiguation pages